WRTP (88.5 FM) is a radio station broadcasting a Christian adult contemporary format. Licensed to Franklinton, North Carolina, United States, it serves the Raleigh/Durham area. The station is currently owned by Radio Training Network, with studios on Falls of Neuse Road in north Raleigh.  Its transmitter is located near Warrenton.

History
After Carolina Christian Communications sold WRTP-AM and simulcast stations WRTG and WGSB to Radio Training Network, that company bought WHGG-FM 90.1 FM in Roanoke Rapids, which was licensed to a school, and changed its name to WRTP-FM. The first translator, W216BN at 91.1 in Raleigh, signed on in 1999, giving the stations a nighttime signal in that area.  W216BN moved from north Raleigh to the WSHA tower to prevent interference to WUNC-FM. Another translator was W257BH at 99.3 FM in Lizard Lick, serving eastern Wake County. In 2005, WRTP-FM moved to the 88.5 frequency, former home of WZRU. After WRTP-AM was sold to Que Pasa Radio, WRTP-FM continued to broadcast, having increased to 24 hours a day, on a network of translators stretching from Chapel Hill to Greenville.

In 2014, WRTP moved its license to the Raleigh exurb of Franklinton.

Translators
In addition to the main station, WRTP is relayed by full-power satellite WCCE in Fayetteville, plus an additional nine low-powered translators across east-central North Carolina. In 2019, iHeartMedia-owned and Wake Forest-licensed station WRDU began simulcasting WRTP on its second HD channel. Four of WRTP's translators were transferred to the WRDU license and officially repeat the WRDU-HD2 signal.

References

External links
Website

RTP
Radio stations established in 1999
1999 establishments in North Carolina
RTP